Merstone is a hamlet on the Isle of Wight. It is home to Merston Manor, built in 1605 in the Jacobean style by Edward Cheeke, and rebuilt in the Victorian era. Merston Manor was first mentioned in the Domesday Book, and the present structure is arguably the oldest brick house on the Island. Prior to the Norman Conquest, Merston Manor was owned by the Brictuin family. The manor now belongs to the Crofts family. According to the Post Office the population of the hamlet was at the 2011 Census included in the civil parish of Arreton.

Although the manor was considered the most important residence, from 1928 onwards, the Latheys (distant relatives of Anne Boleyn - Henry VIII's second wife) were considered to be the most important family to reside in the hamlet, bringing about change and somewhat encouraging the residents to modernise more hastily. One prominent member of the Lathey family, Michael Lathey Jnr became infamous among the occupants of the hamlet due to a string of practical jokes paid on the townsfolk of Newport and its people. One of which was risking his safety to venture into Newport alone and steal the town crest during the great feud (see below) - which was only recently recovered in 1998.

While Merstone has always been considered to be in the Newport district, conflicts have broken out between rival clans; the Merstone Goldwings and the Newport Broadleaves, the quarrels began after a farmer hailing from Merstone accused a man who lived in Newport of stealing three sheep. No-one was killed in the clashes but homes were torched and property vandalized. However, since the early 1900s the disagreements were settled as Newport residents thought it would be better for the town and hamlet to get along since the citizens of Newport needed to use the newly built railway to Ventnor.

Merstone is near the centre of the Island, roughly equidistant from Blackwater to the northwest, Horringford to the east, and Godshill to the south.

In 1875 Merstone station was opened on the Newport to Sandown railway line. In 1897 the station became the starting point of a branch opened by the Isle of Wight Central Railway to St. Lawrence, and completed to Ventnor West in 1900. In 1952 the branch closed, and in 1956, the station and original railway line skirting the hamlet were also closed. The island platform of the former station is still visible adjacent to National Cycle Route 23.

Well-known island architect Percy Goddard Stone, born 15 March 1856, died in The Cottage at Merstone on 21 March 1934. Stone was responsible for many stone monuments on the Island, such as the County War memorial at Carisbrooke Castle, and war memorials in Arreton, Bembridge and Yarmouth, as well as the Queen Victoria memorial in Newport and churches in Wootton and Cowes.

Public transport is now provided by Southern Vectis on Route 2, which operates between Newport and Sandown via Shanklin including intermediate villages.

References

External links

Article about Percy Stone

Villages on the Isle of Wight